The University of Illinois Springfield (UIS) is a public university in Springfield, Illinois.  The university was established in 1969 as Sangamon State University by the Illinois General Assembly and became a part of the University of Illinois system on July 1, 1995. As a public liberal arts college, and the newest campus in the University of Illinois system, UIS is a member of the Council of Public Liberal Arts Colleges. UIS is also part of the American Association of State Colleges and Universities and the American Council on Education. The campus' main repository, Brookens Library, holds a collection of nearly 800,000 books and serials in addition to accessible resources at the University of Illinois Chicago and University of Illinois Urbana-Champaign campuses.

The University of Illinois Springfield serves 4,198 students (Fall 2022) with 56 bachelor's degrees, 39 minors, 44 master's degree, 1 doctorate degree, 37 graduate certificates and coursework that leads to 6 ISBE endorsements. The university was once one of the two upper-division and graduate universities in Illinois, but now accepts freshmen, transfer, and graduate students.

History

Sangamon State University 
In 1967, the Illinois General Assembly created a Board of Regents to operate Illinois State University and Northern Illinois University, as well as a third unnamed institution in Springfield.  In 1969, Governor Richard Ogilvie signed into law a bill officially creating Sangamon State University.  It originally operated as an "upper-division" university—that is, a university that offers only the last two years of undergraduate education, as well as graduate work.  The first classes were held on September 28, 1970, at First Methodist Church in downtown Springfield.  In October, SSU began offering classes in the current campus location near Lake Springfield.

Sangamon State aimed to be a "truly pioneering segment of public education" through a spirit of openness, innovation and adaptability.

The school grew steadily over the years.  Its first permanent building, Brookens Library, was dedicated in 1976, and its Public Affairs Center and first dormitories opened in 1980.

Transition to the University of Illinois System 
In 1995, Governor Jim Edgar signed a bill which abolished the Board of Regents and merged SSU with the University of Illinois system.  On July 1, SSU officially became the University of Illinois Springfield.  Naomi Lynn, the last president of SSU, became the first chancellor of UIS.

Establishment of a four-year general education program 
In 2001, it admitted freshmen for the first time in an honors program called the "Capital Scholars". On September 8, 2005, the University of Illinois Board of Trustees approved a new general education curriculum, making UIS a full-fledged four-year university for the first time. Freshmen were slated to be admitted under the general education curriculum beginning in fall 2006.

Campus

The University of Illinois Springfield is located six miles southeast of Springfield, occupying 740 acres of prairie land adjacent to Lake Springfield and Lincoln Land Community College. In 1841, the land was acquired by Thomas Strawbridge Jr., a prosperous saddler and harness maker in Springfield. The Thomas Strawbridge homestead, constructed around 1845, still stands on the south edge of the University of Illinois Springfield campus and was restored in 2012.

Today, there are three easily identifiable areas on campus: Legacy Campus, SSU Permanent Construction, and the University of Illinois era.

Legacy Campus 
The Legacy Campus hosts an array of student services and facilities buildings. There is also the Cox Children's Center which was established in 1970. Some of the key buildings on this part of campus are the WUIS building, Student Life Building (SLB), Business Services Building (BSB), Human Resources Building (HRB), Student Affairs Building (SAB), and the Visual & Performing Arts Building (VPA).

SSU permanent construction 
The first permanent construction on campus, Brookens Library was completed in 1976 and the Public Affairs Center, was completed in Fall of 1980. These buildings were the first part of a master plan of 1970–1971 that called for an "urban campus" surrounded by restored prairie land, free of all vehicular traffic and easily navigable by pedestrians. All permanent campus buildings would be located within a "ring road", now known as University Drive. The Public Affairs Center also houses Sangamon Auditorium, a 2,018 seat concert hall and performing arts center built in 1981. It occupies the entire second level of the Public Affairs Center.

Residence life 
UIS offers four living options for more than 1,100 students. On the East Campus there are four courts of apartments, one being designated for family housing including Sunflower, Larkspur, CLover, and Bluebell Courts. There is also the housing office at Homer L. Butler Commons (HCOM). On West Campus there are 96 townhouses encompassed within Pennyroyal, Marigold, Trillium and Foxglove court. For first and second year students there are two residence halls, Lincoln Residence Hall (LRH) and Founders Residence Hall (FRH).

Academics

University of Illinois Degrees and Certificates
The University of Illinois Springfield has been offering online courses and degrees since 1999. Currently UIS offers 56 bachelor's degrees, 39 minors, 44 master's degree, 1 doctorate degree, 37 graduate certificates and coursework that leads to 6 ISBE endorsements.

Colleges
College of Business and Management
College of Health, Science, and Technology
College of Liberal Arts & Social Sciences
College of Public Affairs & Education

Student life

Student Newspaper
The UIS Observer is the student online news publication.

Greek Organizations

Fraternities 

Phi Kappa Tau
Delta Kappa Epsilon
Alpha Phi Alpha
Phi Beta Sigma
Sigma Lambda Beta

Sororities 

Alpha Kappa Alpha
Delta Sigma Theta
Gamma Phi Omega
Sigma Sigma Sigma
Zeta Phi Beta

Athletics 

The Illinois–Springfield (UIS) athletic teams are called the Prairie Stars. The university is a member of the Division II level of the National Collegiate Athletic Association (NCAA), primarily competing in the Great Lakes Valley Conference (GLVC) since the 2009–10 academic year, which they became a full-fledged Division II member on August 1, 2010. The Prairie Stars previously competed in the American Midwest Conference (AMC) of the National Association of Intercollegiate Athletics (NAIA) from 2003–04 to 2008–09.

UIS competes in 15 intercollegiate varsity sports: Men's sports include baseball, basketball, cross country, golf, soccer, tennis and track & field (indoor and outdoor); while women's sports include basketball, cross country, golf, soccer, softball, tennis, track & field (indoor and outdoor) and volleyball.

Notable alumni and faculty

Alumni
Cheri Bustos - U.S. representative, Illinois's 17th district (M.A. Public Affairs Reporting) 
Mike Cernovich - alt-right social media personality and host of The Alex Jones Show on InfoWars (2001 B.A. Philosophy) 
Ward Churchill - former University of Colorado professor, social critic, activist (1974 B.A. Communications, 1975 M.A. Communications)
Vince Demuzio - Illinois state senator, 1975–2004 (1981 B.A. in Education and Human Services; 1996 M.A. in Education and Public Policy) 
 Karen A. Hasara - former mayor of Springfield, Illinois, Illinois state senator, (1972 B.A. Psychology, 1992 M.A. Legal Studies) 
 Gordon S. Heddell - former United States Department of Defense inspector general (1975 M.A. Legal Studies)
Jim Langfelder - current mayor of Springfield, Illinois
Al Lewis - Columnist, Dow Jones Newswires 
Kimberly Lightford - current member, Illinois State Senate
Robert "Bobby" McFerrin Jr.- vocal performer and conductor (attended 1975–76, did not complete degree)
Milton J. Nieuwsma - author, Emmy-winning filmwriter-producer (1978 M.A.)
Richard Oruche - shooting guard on the Nigerian national basketball team (2010 B.A. Business Administration)
Richard Osborne - former CEO of Scotsman Industries
 Dana Perino - White House Press Secretary for the George W. Bush administration (1995 M.A. Public Affairs Reporting)
Elgie Sims - current member, Illinois State House of Representatives
Russell Smith - movie producer
Thom Serafin - communications consultant

Faculty
Michael Burlingame, historian
John Knoepfle, poet and translator
Phillip S. Paludan, historian
Paul Simon, political scientist

References

External links

 
 Official athletics website

 
University of Illinois Springfield
Educational institutions established in 1969
1969 establishments in Illinois
Springfield
Public liberal arts colleges in the United States